Kat Rosenfield is an American culture writer, columnist and novelist.

Career  
Rosenfield writes for Reason and UnHerd. She worked as a reporter for MTV News.

In 2019, Rosenfield co-wrote A Trick of Light with Stan Lee. In 2022, her book No One Will Miss Her (2021) was nominated for an Edgar Allan Poe award for Best Novel.

Personal life 
Rosenfield was born into a Jewish family and she is currently based in Norwalk, Connecticut.

Books
No One Will Miss Her (William Morrow, 2021)
A Trick of Light (Mariner Books, 2019)
 Inland (Dutton Books for Young Readers, 2014)
 Amelia Anne is Dead and Gone (Speak, 2012)

References

External links
 Official website

21st-century American women writers
Year of birth missing (living people)
Living people
Writers from Norwalk, Connecticut
American women columnists
American women novelists
21st-century American novelists
Novelists from Connecticut